The Sumitomo Metal Sparks were a Japanese basketball team that played in the Japan Basketball League. They were based in Narashino, Chiba.

Notable players
Makoto Akaho
Dana Jones
Paul Afeaki Khoury
Deanthony Langston 
Yasutaka Okayama
Shuji Ono
Nobunaga Sato
Kazuhiro Shoji
Andre Spencer

References

Defunct basketball teams in Japan
Sports teams in Chiba Prefecture
Basketball teams established in 1958
Basketball teams disestablished in 1998
Sumitomo Group
1958 establishments in Japan
1998 disestablishments in Japan
Narashino